Ken Thorley is an actor who has portrayed various characters in television and film. One of his recurring roles was that of the fictional character "Mot", a Bolian barber on the U.S.S. Enterprise-D on Star Trek: The Next Generation (who was also portrayed by Shelly Desai). He also played a seaman in another episode of ST:TNG.

Filmography

Television

See also
Star Trek: The Next Generation

References

External links
 
 Ken Thorley at NowCasting.com

20th-century American male actors
21st-century American male actors
American male film actors
American male television actors
Living people
Year of birth missing (living people)